Iwo Byczewski (born 29 February 1948, in Poznań) is a Polish diplomat. He served as Deputy Foreign Minister (1991–1995), Ambassador to Belgium and Permanent Representative to the European Union.

Life 
He is a law graduate from the Adam Mickiewicz University in Poznań and studied at the College of Europe (1971–1972, Dante Alighieri promotion) in Bruges. He has a doctorate from the Institute of State and Law of the Polish Academy of Sciences in 1972. Between 1977 and 1982 he was working for the Ministry of Justice. He has been Solidarity member. As active dissident he was taking part in Polish Round Table Agreement negotiations.

He joined the Ministry of Foreign Affairs in 1990 when Poland became independent, serving as vice minister from 1991 to 1995. Then, he worked in business since the mid 90s. In 2001, he was appointed Permanent Representative of Poland to the European Union. From 2002 to 2007, he served as Ambassador to Belgium. From 2012 to 2016 Byczewski served as Ambassador to Tunisia.

He is married to Anna Nehrebecka.

Honours 

 Officer's Cross of the Order of Polonia Restituta (1995)
 Commander's Cross of the Order of Polonia Restituta (2009)

References 

1948 births
Adam Mickiewicz University in Poznań alumni
Ambassadors of Poland to Tunisia
Ambassadors of Poland to Belgium
College of Europe alumni
International law scholars
Living people
Diplomats from Poznań
Permanent Representatives of Poland to the European Union

Polish legal scholars
Solidarity (Polish trade union) activists